Kosmovo is a rural locality (a village) in Sukhonskoye Rural Settlement, Mezhdurechensky District, Vologda Oblast, Russia. The population was 44 as of 2002. There are 3 streets.

Geography 
Kosmovo is located 3 km southwest of Shuyskoye (the district's administrative centre) by road. Kosmovo is the nearest rural locality.

References 

Rural localities in Mezhdurechensky District, Vologda Oblast